L. Ronald Durham is an American civil right activist, pastor and a Baptist minister from Daytona Beach Florida. He has been a pastor at Greater Friendship Baptist Church in Daytona Beach, Florida, leader of local National Action Network and has been in ministry for thirty-eight years.

Early life 
Raised by his grandparents from birth, he learned early that if you want things in life you have to work for them. His grandparents were of meager means and he wanted to have the same nice clothes as some of his classmates.

Keeping the family earnings in mind he wasn't sure that he would be able to attend any college or university, but everything occurred in a messianic way.   He attended Shaw University in Raleigh, North Carolina for four years on a full scholarship provided to him by a complete stranger. From Shaw University, he went on to Evangel Christian University in Monroe, Louisiana where he earned his Doctoral degree.

Activism 
He has been an active activist and raised voice against the wrongdoings and injustices at a broader level. He met the Rev. Al Sharpton during a protest of racial profiling on the New Jersey Turnpike by the State Police and he has been working together with Sharpton for two decades.

Durham along with Rev. Sharpton organized the rally held at Fort Mellon Park in Sanford, Florida on March 21st, 2012 after the slaying of young Trayvon Martin by George Zimmerman. Working with local churches, Durham selected the park as the location after meeting with Sanford city officials. It was estimated that more than 30,000 people from all over the United States and visitors from around the world were in attendance. The demonstration was peaceful and no irregularity was seen, even the traffic patterns were not disrupted.

President of Volusia County Democratic Black Caucus 
Durham was elected as president of Volusia County Democratic Black Caucus. As a new president, he stated his commitment to the people that their voices would be heard. He said that Volusia County Democratic Black Caucus has been very functional in highlighting the issues of the community and he would play his part in this regard, keeping this fact in mind that community's interest would be the superior of all other interests.

Addressing the conference Durham said that voter education is necessary because without this neither the party nor the caucus will be able to address the issues like poverty, rights of women, civil rights, healthcare, and affordable housing. During his speech, he said that balance of power is necessary and it would only be possible if we succeed in educating the voters regarding the value of their votes. He further said that selection of a right candidate and reaching the millennial is more important and we need to focus on these things.

Sports connection 
In 1988, Durham and his wife were the hosts of the National Baseball Card Collectors Convention at the Convention Center in Atlantic City, New Jersey. Some of the guests included Joe DiMaggio, Pete Rose, Booby Thompson, Ralph Branca, and other baseball greats.

Achievements 
In 2011, Dr. Durham was the first African-American pastor in pray before the start of the Daytona 500 race at Daytona International Speedway in Daytona Beach, Florida.

He started assistance programs that provide free food and clothing to anyone in need and created Friendship Academy. The academy is a childcare learning center for preschoolers that are going to gradually add kindergarten through fifth-grade classes.

Dr. Durham is the author of "The Secret Power of Prayer" published by the Sunday School Publishing Board in Nashville, TN. He has served as president of Daytona Beach Black Clergy Alliance, an organization whose purpose and objectives revolve around the civic and civil rights issues. He is also the past co-chairman of the FAITH (Fighting Against Injustice Toward Harmony).

References 

African-American Baptist ministers
Baptist ministers from the United States
Activists for African-American civil rights
Living people
People from Daytona Beach, Florida
20th-century American writers
Writers from Florida
African-American activists
20th-century American male writers
Year of birth missing (living people)
21st-century African-American people